There are at least 25 named lakes and reservoirs in Lincoln County, Arkansas.

Lakes
	Cane Creek Lake, el.  
	Douglas Old River Lake, el.  
	Echubby Lake, el.  
	Harm Coat Bayou, el.  
	Lake Dian, el.  
	Long Lake, el.  
	McDonald Lake, el.  
	Mud Lake, el.  
	Old River Lake, el.  
	Panther Slough, el.  
	Round Lake, el.  
	Sarassa Lake, el.  
	Taylor Old River, el.

Reservoirs
	Capps Lake, el.  
	Clowers Lake, el.  
	Farmers Lake, el.  
	Glover Lake, el.  
	Holthoff Reservoir, el.  
	Matthews Lake Dam, el.  
	McGraw Pond, el.  
	Patocca Lower Lake, el.  
	Patocca Upper Lake, el.  
	Pinchback Reservoir, el.  
	Shooks Reservoir, el.  
	Steeds Lake, el.

See also

 List of lakes in Arkansas

Notes

Bodies of water of Lincoln County, Arkansas
Lincoln